Liquiritin is the 4'-O-glucoside of the flavanone liquiritigenin. Liquiritin is one of flavone compounds derived from licorice.

De novo biosynthesis of liquiritin in Saccharomyces cerevisiae using endogenous yeast metabolites as precursors and cofactors, provides a possibility for the economical and sustainable production and application of licorice flavonoids through synthetic biology.

References

Further reading

External links 

Flavonoid glucosides
Flavanone glycosides